The 2011 UCI Women's Road World Cup was the 14th edition of the UCI Women's Road World Cup. The calendar remained the same as the 2010 edition. Marianne Vos was the defending champion. Dutch rider Annemiek van Vleuten won the overall classification with wins in three events. Her  teammate Marianne Vos came second in the individual standings and  came first in the teams' classification.

Races
Source:

Final ranking
Source:

References

External links
Official site

 
UCI Women's Road World Cup
UCI Women's Road World Cup